Greulich is a surname of German origin. Notable people with the surname include:

Augustus Greulich (1813-1893), German-born American politician
Bernhard Greulich (1902–1995), German athlete 
Billy Greulich (born 1991), British footballer 
Hermann Greulich (1842-1925), Swiss politician

References

Surnames of German origin